Echium albicans, commonly known as white-leaved bugloss, is a species of purple coloured perennial plants from family Boraginaceae, found in Andalucían mountains and in Marbella.

References

albicans
Endemic flora of Spain
Endemic flora of the Iberian Peninsula